The disused Elmhurst railway station was a rail station in Elmhurst, Victoria, Australia  on the Avoca railway line.

Proposal
In 2017, there is a proposal entitled the, Murray Basin rail project designed to link Mildura to Portland with standard gauge track to carry grain and mineral sands.  This upgrading will include the Maryborough to Ararat section of the line, past the site of the disused Elmhurst railway station.

See also
 Ararat railway station
 Avoca railway line
 Avoca railway station, Victoria
 Ben Nevis railway station
 Homebush railway station, Victoria

References

External links
 

Disused railway stations in Victoria (Australia)